Vertical Records is an independent record label founded by Capercaillie member Donald Shaw in 2000, based in Glasgow, Scotland.

Releases
The label has predominantly focused on Celtic and roots music, with releases from Michael McGoldrick (Fused, Wired, Aurora), Shooglenifty (Solar Shears), Harem Scarem (Fishcake, Storm In A Teacup), Karan Casey (Distant Shore, Chasing The Sun), Karen Matheson (Downriver), Capercaillie (Roses and Tears), Aidan O'Rourke (Sirius), but has also released albums by Love and Money frontman James Grant (My Thrawn Glory, Holy Love, Strange Flowers) and Scottish singer-songwriter Roddy Hart (Bookmarks, Sign Language, Road Of Bones, The Dylan EP).

Artists

Aidan O'Rourke
Altan
Andrew White
Breabach
Buille
Capercaillie
Dean Owens
Dolphin Boy
Dreamers' Circus
Marcelo Cuba & Lecter
Donald Shaw & Charlie McKerron
Future Trad Collective
Harem Scarem
James Grant
John McSherry & Dónal O'Connor

Karan Casey
Karen Matheson
Michael McGoldrick
Michael McGoldrick & John McSherry
Monica Queen
Mystery Juice
Nusa
Patsy Reid
Roddy Hart
Róisín Elsafty
Ross Ainslie & Jarlath Henderson
Shooglenifty
Sunhoney
Usher's Island

See also
 List of record labels

References

External links
 Official site
 Vertical Records at Discogs.com

British independent record labels
Record labels established in 2001